The 1982 Baltimore Orioles season was a season in American baseball. The Orioles finished 2nd in the American League East to the eventual AL Champions Milwaukee Brewers. They finished with a record of 94 wins and 68 losses. For the second consecutive season, the Orioles recorded the most grand slams in MLB, hitting eight in 1982. This was long time Oriole manager and future Hall of Famer Earl Weaver's last season managing the Orioles until he returned to manage them from 1985 to 1986.

Offseason 
 January 28, 1982: Doug DeCinces and Jeff Schneider were traded by the Orioles to the California Angels for Dan Ford.
 February 9, 1982: The Orioles traded a player to be named later to the Cincinnati Reds for Paul Moskau. The Orioles completed the deal by sending Wayne Krenchicki to the Reds on February 16.
 February 19, 1982: The Orioles traded a player to be named later to the Texas Rangers for Rick Lisi. The Orioles completed the deal by sending Steve Luebber to the Rangers on February 23.
 March 4, 1982: John Flinn was signed as a free agent by the Orioles.
 March 26, 1982: Dallas Williams and Brooks Carey (minors) were traded by the Orioles to the Cincinnati Reds for Joe Nolan.

Regular season

Opening Day starters 
Al Bumbry
Rich Dauer
Rick Dempsey
Dan Ford
Dennis Martínez
Eddie Murray
Cal Ripken Jr.
Gary Roenicke
Lenn Sakata
Ken Singleton

Season standings

Record vs. opponents

Notable transactions 
 April 5, 1982: Don Stanhouse was signed as a free agent by the Orioles.
 April 5, 1982: Ross Grimsley was signed as a free agent by the Orioles.
 April 28, 1982: Traded José Morales to the Los Angeles Dodgers for Leo Hernández.
 June 7, 1982: 1982 Major League Baseball Draft
Dave Otto was drafted by the Orioles in the 2nd round, but did not sign.
Walt Weiss was drafted by the Orioles in the 10th round, but did not sign.
Billy Ripken was drafted by the Orioles in the 11th round. Player signed June 15, 1982.
 July 15, 1982: Don Stanhouse was released by the Orioles.
 July 23, 1982: Don Stanhouse was signed as a free agent by the Orioles.

A classic near-miss season 
The '82 season was a classic, even though it eventually was as frustrating as those that had preceded it. Eddie Murray had 32 homers and 110 RBIs. Jim Palmer, in his last hurrah, went 15–5.

After starting slowly and falling eight games behind the Milwaukee Brewers in mid-August of '82, the Orioles rallied furiously. They won seven games in a row, lost one, won ten in a row, swept five straight from the New York Yankees, won two of three in Milwaukee to pull within two games of the Brewers with a week left. In the end, they needed to sweep a season-ending four-game series with the Brewers at Memorial Stadium to complete a comeback. They won the first three before roaring crowds, pulling even, and sent Palmer out to pitch the finale against the Brewers' Don Sutton. Fans brought brooms to the stadium, anticipating the final scene of one of the Orioles' greatest comebacks. Instead, the Brewers pounded Palmer and won the American League East title 10–2.

The start of 2,632 consecutive games 
For his first full season in Major League Baseball, Cal Ripken Jr. started off slowly, gathered himself, and ended up as the AL Rookie of the Year, hitting .264 with 28 homers and 93 RBIs.  After all the debate about where he should play, he started the year at third base, switched to shortstop in July, and never looked back.

On May 29, Ripken sat out of the second game of a double header against the Toronto Blue Jays; little did anyone know that it would be his last missed game for the remainder of this season and the 16 seasons to come.  The following day (also against the Blue Jays), his monumental consecutive-games streak got underway.

Weaver's farewell 
After the final out of the loss to the Brewers, an emotional spectacle unfolded at Memorial Stadium. The disappointed sellout crowd rose and started to cheer, and kept cheering for 45 minutes. The Orioles' players left the clubhouse and came back out onto the field to wave, and then Weaver did, too, setting off the biggest roar. The cheers were mostly for him.

Weaver announced in March that the 1982 season would be his last managing the Orioles. he was retiring after that and moving to Florida to play golf. An era was ending. The news had been in the headlines and the back of everyone's mind all season, yet it was almost forgotten as the Orioles chased the Brewers down the stretch. Now, suddenly, the moment was at hand. Weaver was pulling off his uniform for the last time. And the fans weren't going to let him go without a salute.

Roster

Player stats

Batting

Starters by position 
Note: Pos = Position; G = Games played; AB = At bats; H = Hits; Avg. = Batting average; HR = Home runs; RBI = Runs batted in

Other batters 
Note: G = Games played; AB = At bats; H = Hits; Avg. = Batting average; HR = Home runs; RBI = Runs batted in

Pitching

Starting pitchers 
Note: G = Games pitched; IP = Innings pitched; W = Wins; L = Losses; ERA = Earned run average; SO = Strikeouts

Other pitchers 
Note: G = Games pitched; IP = Innings pitched; W = Wins; L = Losses; ERA = Earned run average; SO = Strikeouts

Relief pitchers 
Note: G = Games pitched; W = Wins; L = Losses; SV = Saves; ERA = Earned run average; SO = Strikeouts

Awards and honors 
 Cal Ripken Jr., American League Rookie of the Year
 Ken Singleton, Roberto Clemente Award

All-Star Game
 Eddie Murray

Farm system 

LEAGUE CHAMPIONS: Bluefield

Notes

References 

1982 Baltimore Orioles team page at Baseball Reference
1982 Baltimore Orioles season at baseball-almanac.com
The 1982 Baltimore Orioles: Earl Weaver's Last Hurrah

Baltimore Orioles seasons
Baltimore Orioles season
Baltimore Orioles